Hexahydroxybenzene triscarbonate is a chemical compound, an oxide of carbon with formula . Its molecular structure consists of a benzene core with the six hydrogen atoms replaced by three carbonate groups. It can be seen as a sixfold ester of hexahydroxybenzene (benzenehexol) and carbonic acid.

The compound was obtained by C. Nallaiah in 1984, as a tetrahydrofuran solvate.

See also
 Tetrahydroxy-1,4-benzoquinone biscarbonate
 Tetrahydroxy-1,4-benzoquinone bisoxalate
 Hexahydroxybenzene trisoxalate

References

 

Oxocarbons
Benzene derivatives
Carbonate esters